In enzymology, an allose kinase is an enzyme that catalyzes the chemical reaction

ATP + D-allose  ADP + D-allose 6-phosphate

Thus, the two substrates of this enzyme are ATP and D-allose, whereas its two products are ADP and D-allose 6-phosphate.

This enzyme belongs to the family of transferases, specifically those transferring phosphorus-containing groups (phosphotransferases) with an alcohol group as acceptor.  The systematic name of this enzyme class is ATP:D-allose 6-phosphotransferase. Other names in common use include allokinase (phosphorylating), allokinase, D-allokinase, and D-allose-6-kinase.

References

 

EC 2.7.1
Enzymes of unknown structure